Ravna Reka may refer to the following places in Serbia:

 Ravna Reka (Despotovac)
 Ravna Reka (Vladičin Han)
 Ravna reka (river)